Tooting Bec, originally Trinity Road (Tooting Bec), is a London Underground station in Tooting, South London. The station is on the Northern line, between Balham and  stations. It is located on the junction of Trinity Road (heading north-west), Upper Tooting Road (south-west), Balham High Road (north-east), Tooting Bec Road (south-east) and Stapleton Road (also south-east). The station is in Travelcard Zone 3.

History

The station was designed by Charles Holden and opened on 13 September 1926 as part of the Morden extension of the City & South London Railway, which is now part of the Northern line. Originally known as Trinity Road (Tooting Bec), it was given its present name on 1 October 1950.

The narrow satellite building on the east side of the junction provides pedestrian subway access to the station and is unusual in that it has a large glazed roundel on each of the three panels of its glazed screen, as normally the Morden extension stations have the roundel in just the centre panel. For many years the northern panel of the screen was the sole example on any of the Morden extension stations to retain the 1920s "UNDERGROUND" lettering, the other stations' screens having been replaced with plain glass over the years. All the stations have now had the original motif replaced along with the flag-pole-mounted roundels that had been removed in the 1950s.

On the platforms the station has two examples of clocks from the Self Winding Clock Company of New York City.

Connections

London Buses routes 155, 219, 249, 319 and 355 and night route N155 serve the station.

References

Gallery

External links

London Transport Museum Photographic Archive

Northern line stations
Tube stations in the London Borough of Wandsworth
Former City and South London Railway stations
Railway stations in Great Britain opened in 1926
Charles Holden railway stations
Art Deco architecture in London
Tooting
London Underground Night Tube stations
Art Deco railway stations